The Battenberg family is a non-dynastic cadet branch of the House of Hesse-Darmstadt, which ruled the Grand Duchy of Hesse until 1918. The first member was Julia Hauke, whose brother-in-law Grand Duke Louis III of Hesse created her Countess of Battenberg in 1851, with the style of Illustrious Highness (H.Ill.H.), at the time of her morganatic marriage to Grand Duke Louis's brother Prince Alexander of Hesse and by Rhine. The name of the title refers to the town of Battenberg in Hesse. In 1858, the countess' title was elevated to Princess of Battenberg, with the style of Serene Highness (H.S.H.).

The Battenberg name was last used by Prince Francis Joseph of Battenberg, youngest son of the Princess of Battenberg, who died childless in 1924. In 1917, most members of the family had been residing in the British Empire and had renounced their Hessian titles, due to rising anti-German sentiment among the British during the First World War. At that point, they changed the family name to Mountbatten, an anglicised version of Battenberg. However, Juan, Count of Barcelona, a son of Victoria Eugenie of Battenberg, Queen of Spain, bore the surname of Borbón y Battenberg until his death in 1993.

Creation 
Prince Alexander (1823–1888) was the third son of Grand Duke Louis II of Hesse and by Rhine and of Wilhelmina of Baden, yet it was openly rumoured that his biological father was actually Baron Augustus de Senarclens, his mother's chamberlain. Prince Alexander's spouse, Julia von Hauke (1825–1895), was a mere countess, the orphaned daughter of Count von Hauke, a Polish nobleman of German ancestry who had served as a general in the Imperial Russian Army and then as Deputy Minister of War of Congress Poland.

Count von Hauke's rank was too low for his daughter's children with Prince Alexander to qualify for the succession to the throne of the Grand Duchy of Hesse. For this reason, her new brother-in-law Louis III of Hesse created the title of Countess of Battenberg for her and for the couple's descendants.

In 1858, the title, which referred to the town of Battenberg in Hesse, was elevated to princely status. There was never a corresponding principality of Battenberg; the title was a non-sovereign one in the nobility of the Grand Duchy of Hesse. A previous family of counts of Battenberg had become extinct in the 14th century.

After 1858, the children of this union bore the title of Prince or Princess, with the style of Serene Highness. Battenberg thus became the name of a morganatic cadet branch of the Grand Ducal family of Hesse, without the right of succession.

Members 
 Julia, Princess of Battenberg (1825–1895), married Prince Alexander of Hesse and by Rhine, third son of Louis II, Grand Duke of Hesse, and Wilhelmina of Baden
Princess Marie of Battenberg (1852–1923), married the Prince of Erbach-Schönberg in 1871
 Prince Louis of Battenberg (1854–1921), renounced his title in 1917 and was created Marquess of Milford Haven — he married his first cousin once removed Princess Victoria of Hesse and by Rhine, daughter of Louis IV, Grand Duke of Hesse, and Princess Alice of the United Kingdom
 Princess Alice of Battenberg (1885–1969), married Prince Andrew of Greece and Denmark in 1903
 Princess Louise of Battenberg (1889–1965), renounced her title in 1917 and became Lady Louise Mountbatten, she married the future Gustaf VI Adolf of Sweden in 1923
 Prince George of Battenberg (1892–1938), renounced his title in 1917 and took on his father's junior title of Earl of Medina, later becoming second Marquess of Milford Haven
 Prince Louis of Battenberg (1900–1979), renounced his title in 1917 and became Lord Louis Mountbatten (later created Earl Mountbatten of Burma)
 Prince Alexander of Battenberg (1857–1893), in 1879 was elected as the ruling Prince of Bulgaria, later Count of Hartenau after his abdication. 
 Asen of Hartenau (1890–1965)
 Tsvetana of Hartenau (1893–1935)
 Prince Henry of Battenberg (1858–1896) — married Princess Beatrice of the United Kingdom, a younger daughter of Queen Victoria and Prince Albert
 Prince Alexander of Battenberg (1886–1960), renounced his title in 1917 and was created Marquess of Carisbrooke
 Princess Victoria Eugenie of Battenberg (1887–1969), married Alfonso XIII of Spain in 1906
 Prince Leopold of Battenberg (1889–1922), renounced his title in 1917 and became Lord Leopold Mountbatten
 Prince Maurice of Battenberg (1891–1914)
 Prince Francis Joseph of Battenberg (1861–1924), married Princess Anna of Montenegro

Relations to royal families 
One of the original couple's sons, Prince Alexander of Battenberg, was made Sovereign Prince of Bulgaria; he was later forced to abdicate.

Another son, Prince Henry of Battenberg, married Princess Beatrice, the youngest daughter of Queen Victoria; their daughter, Victoria Eugenia Julia Ena, became queen consort of Spain. Her uncle Edward VII elevated her style to Royal Highness, so that she would have the necessary status to marry into the Spanish royal house.

Alexander and Julia's eldest son, Prince Louis of Battenberg, became the First Sea Lord of the Royal Navy. Due to anti-German feelings prevalent in Britain during the First World War, he anglicised his name to Mountbatten, as did his children and nephews, the sons of Prince Henry and Princess Beatrice.

One of the couple's four sons and one of their grandsons renounced their Hessian titles and were granted peerages by their cousin, George V: Prince Louis became the first Marquess of Milford Haven, while Prince Alexander, Prince Henry's eldest son, was created Marquess of Carisbrooke.

Prince Louis's second daughter, Princess Louise of Battenberg, in 1923 married the future Gustaf VI Adolf of Sweden and in 1950 became Queen Consort of Sweden. His younger son, Louis, became the last Viceroy of India. His elder daughter, Princess Alice of Battenberg, married Prince Andrew of Greece and Denmark; their son, Prince Philip of Greece and Denmark (later styled as Prince Philip, Duke of Edinburgh), married the heir presumptive of the British throne, later Elizabeth II, after having renounced his Greek titles and taken his maternal grandfather's and uncle's surname, Mountbatten. The name Battenberg, in its anglicised form, is now a part of the personal surname, Mountbatten-Windsor, of some members of the British Royal Family.

In 1897, Prince Francis Joseph of Battenberg married Princess Anna of Montenegro, a sister of Queen Elena of Italy and a maternal aunt of Alexander I of Yugoslavia.

Coats of arms
Besides those depicted above;

Family tree

References

External links

 
European royalty
House of Hesse-Darmstadt
Bulgarian royal houses
Bulgarian noble families